Sandusky may refer to:

Places in the United States

Cities and towns
 Sandusky, Indiana
 Sandusky, Iowa
 Sandusky, Michigan
 Sandusky, Ohio
 Upper Sandusky, Ohio
 Sandusky, West Virginia
 Sandusky, Wisconsin

Townships
 Sandusky Township, Crawford County, Ohio
 Sandusky Township, Richland County, Ohio
 Sandusky Township, Sandusky County, Ohio

County
 Sandusky County, Ohio

River
 The Sandusky River in Ohio

Other uses
 Sandusky (surname), a surname
 Sandusky (locomotive), the first locomotive to operate in Ohio
 Sandusky (automobile company), 1902–1904 automobile manufacturer in Ohio
 Sandusky District, a railroad line in Ohio
 Sandusky High School, a secondary school in Sandusky, Ohio
 Sandusky House (Lynchburg, Virginia), a historic home
 Sandusky station, a Sandusky, Ohio, Amtrak station built in 1892